The women's 48 kg competition in judo at the 2020 Summer Olympics in Tokyo was held on 24 July 2021 at the Nippon Budokan.

Results

Finals

Repechage

Pool A

Pool B

Pool C

Pool D

References

External links
 
 Draw 

W48
Judo at the Summer Olympics Women's Extra Lightweight
Women's events at the 2020 Summer Olympics
Olympics W48